Newsteadia is a genus of ensign scale insects in the superfamily Coccoidea. Most species are inconspicuous, measuring under two millimeters long and found in leaf litter.

Species
In 1962, J. M. Hoy stated there were 11 species in the genus. This has since risen to 48 species. These include:

Newsteadia americana Morrison - United States
Newsteadia caledoniensis 
Newsteadia floccosa De Geer – Europe
Newsteadia guadalcanalia Morrison – Solomon Islands
Newsteadia gullanae
Newsteadia mauritania Mamet – Mauritius
Newsteadia minima Morrison – United States
Newsteadia montana Mamet – Mauritius
Newsteadia multispina – Afrotropical
Newsteadia myersi Green – New Zealand
Newsteadia samoana Morrison – Samoa
Newsteadia trisegmentalis James Howell – United States
Newsteadia tristani Silvestri – Mexico and Costa Rica
Newsteadia wacri Strickland – Ghana
Newsteadia yanbaruensis Hirotaka  – Japan
Newsteadia zimmermani Morrison – Fiji

References

Ortheziidae
Sternorrhyncha genera